Powdersville High School (PVHS) is a public high school in Powdersville, South Carolina, United States, a suburb of Greenville located in Anderson County. It is one of three high schools in Anderson School District One, and first opened in August 2011.

History
Prior to the opening of PVHS, students who lived in the Powdersville area attended Wren High School. However, due to growth in the area, Anderson School District 1 voted in 2008 to build a high school for Powdersville. The school started with 265 students in grades 9–10. In 2013–2014, PVHS enrollment was around 750 students in grades 9–12. In 2015–2016 school year, it enrolled around 840 students.

The school held its first graduation on May 30, 2014.

Athletics
The marching band won a 1A state championship in 2012 and the 2A state championship in 2014 and 2016.

State championships 
 Cross Country - Boys: 2016
 Volleyball: 2018, 2019, 2020

References

Public high schools in South Carolina
Schools in Anderson County, South Carolina